Blakea formicaria is a species of plant in the family Melastomataceae. It is endemic to Ecuador.  Its natural habitat is subtropical or tropical moist montane forests.

References

Endemic flora of Ecuador
formicaria
Endangered plants
Taxonomy articles created by Polbot